Marlene may refer to:

People
 Marlene (given name), including a list of people with the name
 Marlene (Burmese businesswoman), Nang Kham Noung (born 1991)
 Marlene (Japanese singer) (born 1960), a Filipina jazz singer active in Japan

Film
 Marlene (1949 film), a French musical crime film
 Marlene (1984 film), a documentary film about Marlene Dietrich
 Marlene (2000 film), a German biopic film about Marlene Dietrich
 Marlene (2020 film), a Canadian docudrama film about Marlene and Steven Truscott

Music
 "Marlene" (song), a 2010 single by Lightspeed Champion
 "Marlene", a song by Jackson C. Frank from Jackson C. Frank
 "Marlene", a song by Todd Rundgren from Something/Anything?

See also
 "Lily Marlene" or "Lili Marleen", a 1938 German love song popular during World War II
 Marlena (disambiguation)
 Marlin, a species of fish